The Wutaishan Gymnasium is an indoor arena in Nanjing, China.  The arena is used mainly for indoor sports such as basketball, and it hosted the final round of the 2002 FIBA World Championship for Women.  The facility has a capacity of 10,000 people.

External links 
Wutaishan Sports Center website 

Sports venues in Nanjing
Indoor arenas in China